Cyprinus acutidorsalis is a species of ray-finned fish in the genus Cyprinus found in China in freshwater.

It can reach a total weight of up to 500 g.

References 

Cyprinus
Taxa named by Wang You-Huai
Fish described in 1979
Fauna of China